The Chensagi River is a tributary of Maicasagi Lake, in Regional County Municipality (RCM) of Eeyou Istchee James Bay (municipality), in the administrative region from Nord-du-Québec, in the Canadian province of Quebec, in Canada.

The lower course of the river successively crosses the townships of Dambourges and Grandfontaine.

The surface of the river is usually frozen from early November to mid-May, however, safe ice circulation is generally from mid-November to mid-April.

Geography 
The main hydrographic slopes near the Chensagi River are:
North side: Chensagi River West, Amisquioumisca Lake, Nipukatasi River, Rocher Lake;
East side: Chensagi River East, Maicasagi River, Moquachéa Lake;
South side: Chensagi River East, Maicasagi River;
West side: Poncheville Lake, Quenonisca Lake, Nipukatasi River.

The Chensagi River originates at the mouth of Gray Pine Lake (length: ,). This mountainous lake receives the waters of eight small mountain lakes.

The mouth of this head lake is located at:
 Northeast of the mouth of the Chensagi River (confluence with Maicasagi Lake;
 Northeast of the mouth of Goéland Lake (Waswanipi River);
North of the mouth of the Matagami Lake;
 Northeast of the mouth of Soscumica Lake;
 Southeast of the mouth of the Nottaway River);
 Northeast of downtown Matagami.

From its source, the "Chensagi River" flows on  according to the following segments:

Upper course of Chensagi river (segment of ).
 Northwesterly, forming a southwesterly curve to a river bend where a stream flows (from the north);
 Southwesterly to a creek (from the east);
 to the Southwest, to the outlet of the lake? (coming from the East);

Intermediate course of Chensagi River (segment of )

 West to a creek (coming from the North);
 Southwesterly, to a creek (coming from the North);
 Southwesterly to a bend of the river where a stream flows (from the North);
 South, to the confluence of the Chensagi River East (coming from the East);
 Southwesterly, forming a southerly curve to the confluence of the Chensagi River West (coming from the North);
 Southwesterly in a straight line to the East shore of Chensagi Lake;

Lower course of Chensagi River (segment of )

 Southwesterly, crossing the Chensagi Lake, to its mouth in the southwestern part of the lake;
 southeasterly in a widening of the river to Frederique Creek (coming from the Southwest);
 southerly in a widening of the river to its mouth.

The "Chensagi River" flows to the bottom of the North-West Bay of Maicasagi Lake. The latter flows southwesterly through the Max Passage into Goéland Lake which is crossed to the northwest by the Waswanipi River.

The mouth of the Chensagi River is located at:
 North of the mouth of Lake Maicasagi.
 Northeast of the mouth of Goéland Lake (Waswanipi River);
 Northeast of the mouth of Olga Lake (Waswanipi River);
 Northwest of the village center of Waswanipi;
 North of downtown of Matagami.

Toponymy 
The toponym "Chensagi River" was formalized on December 5, 1968, at the Commission de toponymie du Québec, i.e. at the creation of this commission

References

See also 

Rivers of Nord-du-Québec
Nottaway River drainage basin
Eeyou Istchee James Bay